Hisonotus megaloplax is a species of catfish in the family Loricariidae. It is native to South America, where it occurs in the drainage basin of the Passo Fundo River, which is a tributary of the Uruguay River. It reaches 4.7 cm (1.9 inches) SL.

Hisonotus megaloplax was described in 2009 by Tiago P. Carvalho (of the Pontifical Xavierian University) and Roberto E. Reis (of the Pontifical Catholic University of Rio Grande do Sul) alongside three other Hisonotus species from the Uruguay River basin: H. iota, H. montanus, and H. leucophrys. The type locality of H. megaloplax is stated to be a stream known as the Arroio Caraguatá near a secondary road of BR-153 between Passo Fundo and Ipiranga do Sul in the Brazilian state of Rio Grande do Sul.

References 

Otothyrinae
Fish described in 2009